Oil on Canvas is a live album by the English band Japan, released in June 1983 by Virgin Records. It was released six months after the band had broken up, and became their highest charting album in the UK, peaking at number 5. It has been certified Gold by the British Phonographic Industry for sales in excess of 100,000 copies.

Content 
The live tracks on the double-album were taken from the band's performances at the Hammersmith Odeon in November 1982, during their final live concert tour. With guitarist Rob Dean having left the band in spring 1981, Japanese musician Masami Tsuchiya (then of the group Ippu-Do) was added to the touring line-up on guitar and additional keyboards. The band also used backing tracks to supply additional instrumental parts (for example, in contrast to some previous tours where a guest saxophonist was recruited, many of Karn's saxophone lines were played from tape.)

Billed as a live recording, Jansen later admitted that only the drums were actually recorded live, the rest being recorded in a studio. The album also contained three new instrumental studio tracks ("Oil on Canvas", "Voices Raised in Welcome, Hands Held in Prayer" and "Temple of Dawn"), recorded separately by Sylvian, Sylvian/Jansen and Barbieri respectively (the name of Barbieri's track is taken from the novel The Temple of Dawn by the acclaimed Japanese novelist Yukio Mishima).

Release and aftermath 
Although the album was released some months following the band's much publicised split in late 1982, it was Japan's highest charting album in the UK (where it reached No. 5). The album was certified "Gold" by the BPI in 1988 for 100,000 copies sold.

A single, "Canton", was released, with the B-side "Visions of China". It reached No. 42 in the UK Singles Chart.

A video version of Oil on Canvas was also released by Virgin Records. This was re-released on DVD in 2006 as "The Very Best of Japan", which also features many of the band's promotional videos.

Seven years after the release of Oil on Canvas the four members of Japan, David Sylvian, Steve Jansen, Mick Karn and Richard Barbieri, reunited for another studio album, under the group moniker Rain Tree Crow.

A remastered CD reissue came out in 2003 with the cover art changed to only showing the slightly cropped and less colourful Auerbach painting.

Reception 
Reviewing for Record Mirror, Betty Page described the album as "elegiac; very 'remember us this way', but also very 'Sunday Times colour supplement special offer'." "The visuals you can get elsewhere, of course, but you don't miss them. The aural ambience is perfectly sufficient to wallow in the privacy of your own home environment. It's all very Habitat: elegant but with simple curves, très ergonomic, adding a touch of sophistication to any colour scheme. It's not intended to make any converts, thank God, but it'll surely make a sad but satisfying memorial for the ever present ranks of devotees".

Track listing 

Note: some early CD pressings of the Oil on Canvas album omit the tracks "Gentlemen Take Polaroids" and "Swing".

Personnel

Japan
 David Sylvian: lead vocals, occasional keyboards, cover concept
 Mick Karn: fretless bass guitar, backing vocals, clarinet, saxophone
 Steve Jansen: drums, marimba
 Richard Barbieri: keyboards/synthesizers

Additional personnel
 Masami Tsuchiya: electric guitar, keyboards, tapes
Frank Auerbach - cover painting
Anton Corbijn - photography
Ivette Anna - photography (handtinting)
Engineered by Nigel Walker, John Punter

Charts

References

Japan (band) albums
1983 live albums
Albums produced by John Punter
Virgin Records live albums
Albums recorded at the Hammersmith Apollo